Shlomo Shamir (15 June 1915 – 19 May 2009) was the third Commander of the Israeli Navy (1949–1950), and the first Israeli Navy Commander to receive the rank of Aluf. He was the third Commander of the Israeli Air Force (1950–1951).

Biography 

Shlomo Shamir was born Shlomo Rabinowitch, in Berdychiv, Russian Empire. He was taken to Mandatory Palestine in 1925. In 1929 he joined the Haganah and was instrumental in smuggling weapons and illegal Jewish immigrants into Palestine during the time of the British Mandate and the White Paper of 1939. In 1940 he received his pilot license, and in the same year he joined the Royal Air Force in order to fight the Nazis and gain experience in warfare. In 1946 he was discharged from the British military with the rank of major.

In 1948 he was ordered by Prime Minister David Ben-Gurion to lead the Israeli 7th Armored Brigade in the fight to conquer Latrun. He was also instrumental in creating the Burma Road. At the end of the 1947–1949 Palestine war he was offered to be appointed as the Chief of the General Staff, but he refused. Instead he served other capacities, eventually becoming the third Commander of the Israeli Navy in May 1949. He helped build the small Israeli Navy by purchasing a new corvette and advanced torpedo boats. In 1950, he was replaced as Commander of the Israeli Navy by Mordechai Limon and became the Commander of the Israeli Air Force. Under his leadership, the Israeli Air Defense Network was created, and the Hatzor Israeli Air Force Base built. In August 1951, he handed command of the Air Force over to Haim Laskov and retired from the Israel Defense Forces.

In civilian life, Shamir became a successful businessman, creating many companies. He received a master's degree in Social Sciences from Tel Aviv University and a master's degree in administration from Harvard University.

On 19 May 2009 Shamir died in Tel Aviv at the age of 93, leaving his daughter Yael, two grandchildren and one great-grandchild.

References

1915 births
People from Berdychiv
Jews from the Russian Empire
Soviet Jews
Ukrainian Jews
Israeli Jews
Royal Air Force personnel of World War II
Israeli Navy generals
Israeli Air Force generals
2009 deaths
Soviet emigrants to Mandatory Palestine
Israeli people of Ukrainian-Jewish descent
Harvard University alumni
Mandatory Palestine military personnel of World War II
Tel Aviv University alumni
Jewish Brigade personnel
Burials at Trumpeldor Cemetery